"Hey, Look Me Over" is a song from the 1960 Broadway musical Wildcat. In the original musical, the song was sung by comedy actress Lucille Ball, in what was the only Broadway appearance of her career.

Cy Coleman later described the problem facing the songwriting team (Coleman and Carolyn Leigh): "How to write for a woman who had five good notes.  And not just any woman, but the biggest star in the world at the time.  What is she going to sing when she steps out on that stage for the first time?  She had to land big or else we were all dead."  During a brainstorming session, Coleman played one of his ideas on piano, doubtful it would work as a star vehicle.  Leigh surprised him by calling back a few days later with a funny (incomplete) lyric for his melody.

Ball and co-star Paula Stewart performed the song live on The Ed Sullivan Show, and it was subsequently recorded and/or performed by, among others, Louis Armstrong, Judy Garland, Rosemary Clooney, Bing Crosby, Peggy Lee, Johnny Mathis, Bobby Short, Gene Krupa, Mel Tormé, Jerry Vale, Julie Wilson, Lucie Arnaz, the Pete King Chorale, and British singer Ronnie Hilton.

References

Songs from musicals
1960 songs
Louis Armstrong songs
Judy Garland songs
Vikki Carr songs
Bing Crosby songs
Songs with music by Cy Coleman
Songs with lyrics by Carolyn Leigh